Cathkin Braes is an area of hills to the south east of the city of Glasgow, in Scotland. It lies to the south of the districts of Castlemilk, Fernhill and Burnside, and to the east of Carmunnock.

It was a rallying point in the Radical War. It includes The Big Wood and Cathkin Braes Park Woodland, both areas of mature beech, sycamore and oak trees. In addition there is grassland, heath, hedgerows and wetlands. These natural areas provide foraging habitat for a number of species, including kestrels and owls.

A number of mountain bike trails have been constructed in the area. These were used for the 2013 British National Mountain Biking Championships, and was the venue for mountain biking at the 2014 Commonwealth Games. These trails include one orange, two red, and one blue. There is also a skills park and pump track at the bottom of the hill. The skills park includes drop off practise, jump practise and rock roll practise. 

Since 2013, a single 3 MW wind turbine –  in height including the blades – has been in place at the brow of the Braes, just inside the Glasgow City boundary (a trig point and transmitter station a short distance to the east are within South Lanarkshire). Due to its prominent location, the turbine can be seen from across the city. It is unclear if more are planned for the area, with subsidy funding for onshore windfarms cut by the UK Government in 2015, although local bodies were supportive of further projects.  

The vista of the city from its summit was used as the original title card for the police drama Taggart.

References

External links

 CCathkin Braes Country Park – Glasgow City Council
Painting of view from Cathkin Braes showing Castlemilk House and stables by T. Williams, hosted at Art UK (work itself held at Hamilton Low Parks Museum)
City of Glasgow HD (composite image photographed from Cathkin Braes, April 2013) at GigaPan

Geography of Glasgow
Parks and commons in Glasgow
Parks in South Lanarkshire
Rutherglen
2014 Commonwealth Games venues
Sports venues in Glasgow
2018 European Championships venues
Cycle racing in Scotland
Mountain biking venues in the United Kingdom